Barnesville is an unincorporated community in Bourbon County, Kansas, United States.

History
Barnesville was platted in 1858 by J. and F. Barnes, and named for them. A post office was established at Barnesville in 1856, and remained in operation until it was discontinued in 1906. A Civil War era military post, Barnesville's Post, is located in the area.

References

Further reading

External links
 Bourbon County maps: Current, Historic - KDOT

Unincorporated communities in Bourbon County, Kansas
Unincorporated communities in Kansas